Gladiolus carneus is a plant species in the family Iridaceae.

Common name for this plant is Painted Lady Gladiolus. A tunicated corm, it is summer dormant. Native to South Africa in a dry summer - wet winter climate. Grows about 50 cm high. Very ornamental and a good cut flower.

Cultivation
Gladiolus carneus grows well in the ground in Mediterranean climates or anywhere in pots. It reliably comes back. Can be dug and stored for the summer. Keep it dry in the summer. Plant in autumn with 5 cm (2 in) of soil over the bulb and 5 - 10 cm (2 - 4 inches) apart.

References

carneus
Taxa named by François-Étienne de La Roche